Federico Campagna (born 1984) is an Italian philosopher based in London. His recent work revolves around the metaphysical and ethical challenges posed by contemporary nihilism, and the possibility of a fundamental philosophical architecture of emancipation. He is the author of Technic and Magic: the reconstruction of reality  (Bloomsbury, 2018) and The Last Night: antiwork, atheism, adventure (Zero Books, 2013). He is the editor of Franco Berardi Bifo's philosophical anthology Quarant'Anni Contro il Lavoro  (Derive/Approdi, 2017) and of What We Are Fighting For  (Pluto Press, 2012).

References

External links

Living people
1984 births